The Döhlen Formation is a geologic formation in Germany. It preserves fossils dating back to the Asselian stage of the Permian period.

Fossil content 
 Pantelosaurus saxonicus

See also 
 List of fossiliferous stratigraphic units in Germany
 Niederhäslich Formation

References

External links 
 

Geologic formations of Germany
Permian Germany
Asselian
Paleontology in Germany